There have been two Baronetcies created for persons with the surname Strachan, both in the Baronetage of Nova Scotia. Both are currently either extinct or dormant.

Strachan baronets, of Thornton, Kincardine (1625)
The Strachan Baronetcy, of Thornton, Kincardine, was created in the Baronetage of Nova Scotia in 1625 for Alexander Strachan, a favourite of King Charles I, and a Commissioner of the Exchequer. Their arms were; or, a hart, tripping, at gaze, azure, attired sable.
According to Cokayne’s Complete Baronetage the baronetcy was subsequently assumed by claimants with a very doubtful title to it. The numbering of the baronets is, perhaps as a consequence, very confused. The baronetcy has remained unclaimed since the death of the self-styled 10th baronet in 1854.

 Sir Alexander Strachan, 1st Baronet (d. 1659)

Early doubtful assumption
 Sir James Strachan, 2nd Baronet (d.1686); allegedly a descendant from a remote ancestor of the 1st Baronet, but “the relationship… is so distant, and the pedigree so uncertain that the right of such assumption seems extremely doubtful”.
 Sir James Strachan, 3rd Baronet (c.1640-1715); he was said to be a nephew but “more likely was a cousin” of the 2nd Baronet”.
 Sir William Strachan, 4th Baronet; son and heir of the 3rd Baronet.
 Sir Francis Strachan, 5th Baronet; brother of the 4th Baronet.

Following the death of Sir Francis, two rival claimant lines are recorded.

First claimant line
 Sir John Strachan, 6th Baronet (d. c. 1765); “stated to be grandson of a brother of the grandfather” of the 5th Baronet, who had previously resigned the title to his father, John Strachan of Sweden.
 Sir John Strachan, 7th Baronet (d. 26 December 1777) (sometimes identified as the 5th Baronet); nephew of the 6th Baronet.
 Sir Richard John Strachan, 8th Baronet (27 October 1760 – 3 February 1828) (sometimes identified as the 6th Baronet); nephew of the 7th Baronet.

Second claimant line
 “Sir” Alexander Strachan, “6th Baronet”; “conjectured to be grandson” of the 3rd Baronet.
 “Sir” Alexander Strachan, “7th Baronet” (d. 3 January 1793); son of the “6th Baronet”.
 “Sir” Robert Strachan, “8th Baronet” (c.1737-2 April 1826); brother of the “7th Baronet”.

Subsequent further assumption
Following the extinction of both claimant lines, the title was assumed by:
 “Sir” John Strachan, “9th Baronet” (c.1761-9 June 1844); “Mr. Strachan sought to instruct his descent from Roger Strachan, of Glichno, brother of John Strachan, of Thornton, great grandfather of the 1st Baronet… This statement of pedigrees, unsupported by evidence and in entire variance with chronological requirements, being accepted by a friendly jury and certified by the Canongate Bailies, formed the basis of a retour in Chancery, bearing date 8 Nov. 1841.”
 “Sir” John Strachan, “10th Baronet” (d. 28 January 1854); son of the “9th Baronet”.

Strachan baronets, of Inchtuthill (1685)

The Strachan Baronetcy, of Inchtuthel, was created in the Baronetage of Nova Scotia in 1685 for Thomas Strachan. It became extinct upon his death.

 Sir Thomas Strachan, 1st Baronet

See also
 Clan Strachan

References

Dormant baronetcies in the Baronetage of Nova Scotia
Extinct baronetcies in the Baronetage of Nova Scotia
1625 establishments in England